The flag of South Holland was adopted on 15 October 1985, replacing the flag used since 22 June 1948.

History
The first official flag of South Holland was introduced on 22 June 1948. It was a triband consisting of three equal horizontal fields; yellow on the top, red in the middle and yellow on the bottom. It had a ratio of 2:3.

The current flag was proposed by the provincial executive of South Holland 15 October, and passed by the States of South Holland on 24 October 1985. It was decided to change the flag into a yellow field with a red rampant lion–the old flag of the Counts of Holland, which according to tradition had been in use since the time of the Crusades. The lion was supposed to symbolize the "always victorious lion of Judah". The flag became official on 1 January 1986.

Design
The flag of South Holland has a ratio of 2:3. It features a red lion rampant facing left on a yellow field. The lion covers three-fourths of the flag's height, and is positioned on one-thirds of the flag's width. The flag is based on the coat of arms of South Holland, which in turn is derived from the coat of arms of the original County of Holland. The colours red and yellow are Holland's traditional colours and are also found of the flag of North Holland.

References

Flags displaying animals
Culture of South Holland
South Holland
South Holland